The 1955 Pacific typhoon season has no official bounds; it ran year-round in 1955, but most tropical cyclones tend to form in the northwestern Pacific Ocean between June and December. These dates conventionally delimit the period of each year when most tropical cyclones form in the northwestern Pacific Ocean. The season produced a large number of tropical storms but most of them were weak, and sources from American typhoon warning agencies often grossly overestimated the maximum wind speed of many systems which could not properly match with their respective central pressure observations.

The scope of this article is limited to the Pacific Ocean, north of the equator and west of the international date line. Storms that form east of the date line and north of the equator are called hurricanes; see 1955 Pacific hurricane season. Tropical Storms formed in the entire west Pacific basin were assigned a name by the Fleet Weather Center on Guam.

Systems 

The rest of the storms, such as unnumbered and unnamed tropical depressions and storms, are only classified by the CMA while the JMA is sometimes rare before the 1960s - 1970s.

Typhoon Violet 

Typhoon Violet formed on January 1 and dissipated on January 6. It peaked as a Category 1 typhoon by the JTWC before making landfall in Mindinao in the Philippines.

JMA Tropical Storm Two

Typhoon Wilda 

 Forming in an area full of islands, Wilda moved up into the open ocean where it reached typhoon strength. Shortly after, Wilda peaked in intensity as a lower-end category 2 cyclone. Wilda soon made a turn and began to weaken. Soon enough, Wilda had weakened under typhoon strength and dissipated on March 29.

Typhoon Anita 

Anita formed as a tropical depression on April 17. Anita entered a phase of warm waters, and it rapidly intensified to a category 1 typhoon and even a category 2 typhoon later. Anita encountered on a phase of cool waters, and as a result, it gradually weakened. Anita but re-intensified into a category 1 typhoon on April 20. However, it weakened again on April 22 but again re-intensified to a category 1 and even a category 2 typhoon later. Anita reached its peak intensity as a category 3 typhoon. Anita encountered a strong wind shear and because of this, Anita rapidly weakened to a tropical storm. Anita weakened to a tropical depression on April 25. Later, Anita loses its identity and dissipated.

Typhoon Billie 
Billie hit China as a weak typhoon.

JMA Tropical Storm Six

Typhoon Clara

Tropical Storm Dot

Typhoon Ellen

Tropical Storm 09W

Typhoon Fran 

On July 18, a tropical depression formed southeast of Japan. It entered a phase of favorable environments and was soon upgraded into a tropical storm and named Fran. Fran then moved into a favorable environment and Fran was upgraded into a category 1 typhoon. Intensification occurred and Fran intensified from a category 1 to 4 typhoon and reached its peak intensity. After peaking in intensity, unfavorable environments made Fran to start a weakening trend. On July 20, Fran weakened to a category 2 typhoon and later weakened to a category 1 typhoon and even as a strong tropical storm. On July 21 of noon, Fran weakened to a tropical depression, and soon encountered with strong wind shear and dissipated. Fran became extratropical on July 21, before moving further to the east and dissipated on July 23.

JMA Tropical Storm Twelve

Typhoon Georgia

JMA Tropical Storm Fifteen

Typhoon Hope 

A tropical depression formed east of Philippines on August 2. It intensified to a tropical storm in the next day and named Hope. Hope intensified into a category 1 hurricane while at the south of Japan. It weakened to a tropical storm and the storm turned to the north and intensified into a category 1 again.

It was downgraded to a tropical storm and turned northeast before it slowed down. Hope became extratropical on August 17. Shortly after, the remnants hit the south of Kamchatka Peninsula and dissipated.

JMA Tropical Storm Sixteen

JMA Tropical Storm Seventeen 

Seventeen was a short tropical storm that never affected land.

JMA Tropical Storm Eighteen 
This storm never affected land, it remained in open waters.

Typhoon Iris

Typhoon Joan

Typhoon Kate

Typhoon Louise 

Louise formed on September 20 as a weak tropical depression. It intensified into a tropical storm and even a typhoon later. Wind shear quickly decreased and sea surface temperatures began to rise and Louise rapidly intensified into a category 5 super typhoon. However, the process of eyewall replacement cycle caused Louise to weaken. Louise weakened to a category 2 typhoon and it started to affect the Kyūshū island of Japan and even weakened to a category 1 typhoon and affected Japan. Louise dissipated on September 30. On Kyūshū island, 54 people were killed and 14 went missing.

Typhoon Marge

JMA Tropical Storm Twenty-four

Tropical Storm 17W

Typhoon Nora

Typhoon Opal

Tropical Storm 20W

Typhoon Patsy 

Patsy started on its life as a tropical depression on November 25. It hit Philippines as a tropical storm. It moved out of area before intensifying into Typhoon Patsy. Patsy reached its peak intensity before undergoing an eyewall replacement cycle and started to weaken.

Typhoon Ruth

Storm names 
The following names listed here are names of the 1955 Pacific Typhoon Season.

See also 

 1955 Pacific hurricane season
 1955 Atlantic hurricane season
 1955 North Indian Ocean cyclone season
 Australian region cyclone seasons: 1954–55 1955–56
 South Pacific cyclone seasons: 1954–55 1955–56
 South-West Indian Ocean cyclone seasons: 1954–55 1955–56